The Samsung Galaxy J2 is an Android smartphone manufactured by Samsung Electronics. It was announced and released in September 2015.

Specifications

Hardware 
The Galaxy J2 is powered by an Exynos 3475 SoC including a quad-core 1.3 GHz ARM Cortex-A7 CPU, an ARM Mali-T720 GPU and 1 GB RAM. The 8 GB internal storage can be upgraded up to 256 GB via microSD card.

It features a 4.7-inch Super AMOLED display. The rear camera has 5megapixels with LED flash, f/2.2 aperture and autofocus; the front camera has 2 megapixels with f/2.2 aperture.

Software 
The Galaxy J2 is shipped with Android 5.1.1 "Lollipop" and Samsung's TouchWiz user interface.

See also 
 Samsung Galaxy
 Samsung Galaxy J series

References

External links 

Android (operating system) devices
Samsung smartphones
Mobile phones introduced in 2015
Samsung Galaxy
Discontinued smartphones
Mobile phones with user-replaceable battery